Tina Pakravan (born 17 April 1977) is an Iranian film director, writer, producer, and actress.

Career

Tina Pakravan was born in 1977 in Tehran. She did a B.A. in movie directing from Tehran Faculty of Cinema and Theater. Her cinematic career was begun with contributing to the magazine Gozāresh-e Film in 1995, followed by her contribution to such magazines as Abrār-e Sinamāyi, Sedā, Durbin, Harakat, and Fakur weekly.

At the age of eighteen, Pakravan acted as the script girl of the movie Yās-hā-ye Vahshi (The Wild Jasmines), directed by Mohsen Mohseninasab. In the movie Killing Mad Dogs, directed by Bahram Bayzai, Pakravan was the director's assistant. In two TV series, Ta’tilāt-e Nowruzi (Nowruz Holidays), a production of IRIB TV2, and Rāz-e Sokut (Silence’s Secret), she was the programmer as well as deputy production manager.

Pakravan went to the United States to continue with her education, where she majored in cinema at UCLA. There she made two short movies: Ro’yā (Dream), starring Behzad Farahani and Mozhgan Rabbani, and Actor Actor. She also made the documentary Hamrāh bā Irāniān (Accompanied by Iranians) for Jām-e Jam TV, which deals with the lives of Iranians in Los Angeles and San Francisco.

Back in Iran, Pakravan collaborated with Seyyed Zia’eddin Dorri in the production of the TV series Kolāh-e Pahlavi (The Pahlavi Hat) as the directing programmer and director's first assistant. She went on to collaborate with the director Dariush Mehrjoui as the production manager of the movie Santuri. She was also the production manager and programmer of the movies Vaghti Hame Khābim (When We Are All Asleep), directed by Bahram Bayzai, and Ekhrājihā 2 (The Outcasts, Part 2), directed by Masoud Dehnamaki.

Pakravan's third short film was named Gereh (Knot), starring Mohammad-Reza Sharifinia, Sara Khoeniha, Shaqayeq Farahani, and Mehrab Rezayi.

Pakravan's acting debut was the TV series Sāl-hā-ye Mashrouteh (The Years of The Constitution), in which she was also the production manager, stage designer, and script consultant.

Teaching, writing books, translating, and writing critiques for the press, as well as holding photo exhibitions are among her other activities.

Filmography

Film

Home Video

Short Film

Television Film

Television Series

Notes and references

External links

Soureh Cinema profile 

1977 births
Iranian documentary film producers
Iranian film actresses
Iranian make-up artists
Iranian documentary film directors
Iranian women film directors
Living people
People from Tehran
University of California, Los Angeles alumni